Michalis Boukouvalas (born 14 January 1988) is a Greek professional footballer who plays as a right-back for Super League 2 club Veria. He has also been capped for Greece at youth level.

Career

Club
In 2007, he was transferred to Larissa, after playing with Panetolikos for three years. In August 2011 he signed for Kerkyra. On 23 July 2013 he signed a two-year contract with Iraklis. He made his debut for his new club in an away 3–2 loss against Kavala. On 14 June 2015, Boukouvalas penned a three-year contract with Iraklis.

On 3 August 2016, he signed a two-year contract with PAS Giannina. On 11 May 2018 he extended his contract with the club till the summer of 2020 for an undisclosed fee.

International
He is a former member of Greece U-19. He was a starter in all five games of the Greek team that reached the final during the 2007 UEFA European Under-19 Football Championship.

On 19 May 2016, was called up to the senior squad for the friendly matches against Australia on 4 and 7 June 2016.

Honours 
PAS Giannina

 Super League Greece 2: 2019–20

References

External links
Profile at epae.org
Profile at Onsports.gr

1988 births
Living people
Greek footballers
Panetolikos F.C. players
Athlitiki Enosi Larissa F.C. players
Trikala F.C. players
A.O. Kerkyra players
Iraklis Thessaloniki F.C. players
Super League Greece players
Footballers from Agrinio
PAS Giannina F.C. players
Association football defenders
Veria NFC players